Masterson is a surname that originated in Ireland. It is the anglicised form of the Gaelic Mac Mháighistir. Notable people with the surname include:

Bat Masterson (1853-1921), gunfighter, lawman, sports writer
Chase Masterson (born 1963), American actress
Christina Masterson (born 1989), American actress
Christopher Masterson (born 1980), American actor
Danny Masterson (born 1976), American actor, older brother of Christopher Masterson
Emma Masterson (born 1977), Thai actress, model and television presenter
Fay Masterson (born 1974), English actress
James F. Masterson (1926-2010), American psychiatrist
Justin Masterson (born 1985), American baseball player
Kelly Masterson, American screenwriter
Lisa Masterson (born 1966) OB/GYN on the talk show The Doctors
Luke Masterson (born 1998), American football player
Martha Gay Masterson (1837–1916), American settler and diarist 
Mary Stuart Masterson (born 1966), American actress
Paul Masterson, music producer
Rod Masterson (1945-2013), American actor
Ronnie Masterson (1926-2014), Irish actress
 Scott Masterson (born 1976) Lawyer
Valerie Masterson (born 1937), English opera singer
Walt Masterson (1920-2008), American baseball pitcher
Wayne Masterson (1959-1991), British scientist

Fictional characters 

 Teresa Masterson, a character from the Australian soap opera Home and Away; portrayed by Simone McAullay
Jill Masterson, from Goldfinger
Cookie Masterson, character from American trivia party game You Don't Know Jack; portrayed by Tom Gottlieb
Jen Masterson, fictional character on Canadian cartoon series 6teen

English-language surnames
Surnames of British Isles origin